Musselburgh railway station is a railway station in Musselburgh, Scotland.

Musselburgh railway station may also refer to one of these closed stations that served Musselburgh, Scotland:
 Musselburgh railway station (1847) on the Musselburgh branch
 Inveresk railway station originally opened as Musselburgh railway station in 1846